Esençay is a village in Mut district of Mersin Province, Turkey. It is to the east of the Göksu River valley in the Taurus Mountains. The population of the village was 174 as of 2012.

References

Villages in Mut District